This was the first edition of the tournament.

Groth and Guccione won the title, defeating Dominik Meffert and Tim Puetz in the final, 6–3, 7–6(7–5).

Seeds

Draw

Draw

References
 Main Draw

2014 ATP Challenger Tour
2014 Doubles
2014 in Chinese tennis